Auke Jan Ijspeert (born 1971 in Geneva) is a Swiss-Dutch roboticist and neuroscientist. He is a professor of  biorobotics in the Institute of Bioengineering at EPFL, École Polytechnique Fédérale de Lausanne, and the head of the Biorobotics Laboratory at the School of Engineering.

Career 

He has studied physics at EPFL and 
a degree of an "Ingénieur physicien" (equivalent to Master's degree) in 1995. He joined John Hallam and David Willshaw at the University of Edinburgh as a doctoral student, and in 1999 graduated with a PhD in artificial intelligence on the "Design of artificial neural oscillatory circuits for the control of lamprey- and salamander-like locomotion using evolutionary algorithms". He worked as a postdoctoral researcher with Michael A. Arbib and Stefan Schaal at University of Southern California (USC), and then at EPFL with Jean-Daniel Nicoud and with Luca Maria Gambardella (Dalle Molle Institute for Artificial Intelligence Research - IDSIA).

In 2001, he became a research assistant professor at the Department of Computer Science of the University of Southern California, and an external collaborator at ATR (Advanced Telecommunications Research institute) in Japan. From 2003 to 2017, he was an adjunct faculty Department of Computer Science of the University of Southern California. In 2002, he received Swiss National Science Foundation assistant professorship at the School of Computer and Communication Sciences of EPFL. In 2009, he was named associate professor at EPFL's School of Engineering, and in 2016 he was promoted as full professor. He leads the Biorobotics Laboratory at the School of Engineering.

Research 
The Ijspeert group's transdisciplinary research is situated at the intersection of robotics, computational neuroscience, nonlinear dynamical systems, and applied machine learning. Employing numerical simulations and robots, they aim at a better understanding of animal locomotion and movement control, and by taking inspiration in nature, they design new types of robots and locomotion controllers. Their research was featured in public presentations at TED Global and World.minds conferences.

Their research is focused on computational aspects of locomotion control, sensorimotor coordination, and learning in animals and in robots. Furthermore, their research focuses also on rehabilitation robotics, such as exoskeletons, and in locomotion restoration. Their interests extent to research projects in areas such as neuromechanical simulations of locomotion and movement control; systems of coupled nonlinear oscillators for locomotion control; design and control of amphibious, legged, and reconfigurable robots; and, control of humanoid robots, and of exoskeletons.

The research of Ijspeert's group has been featured in news outlets such as IEEE Spectrum, New Scientist, Tech Crunch, Le Temps, Nature, SwissInfo, The Washington Post, Cosmos, CNN, SRF, Tages-Anzeiger, The Mirror, and Der Standard.

Distinctions 
Ijspeert is an IEEE Fellow. He is a member of the board of reviewing editors of Science Magazine, and an associate editor of Soft Robotics, IEEE Transactions on Medical Robotics and Bionics, and for the International Journal of Humanoid Robotics. He has been an associate editor for the IEEE Transactions on Robotics (2009-2013) and a guest editor for the Proceedings of IEEE, IEEE Transactions on Biomedical Engineering, Autonomous Robots, IEEE Robotics and Automation Magazine, and Biological Cybernetics.

He is a recipient of the Young Professorship Award (2002), the Young Researcher Scholarship (1999), and the Young Researcher Scholarship (1995) all awarded from the Swiss National Science Foundation . He also received the Marie Curie Scholarship from the European Commission (1997).

Public involvements 
Ijspeert is also involved in his local church, the parish of Ecublens-St-Sulpice that is part of the Evangelical Reformed Church of the Canton of Vaud, and he is member of its parish council since 2019.

Selected works

References

External links 
 
 Website of the Biorobotics Laboratory

1971 births
Living people
École Polytechnique Fédérale de Lausanne alumni
Alumni of the University of Edinburgh
University of Southern California alumni
Academic staff of the École Polytechnique Fédérale de Lausanne
Neuroscientists
Biological engineering